Southern Stove Works, Manchester is a historic factory complex located in Richmond, Virginia that replaced the company's original factory. The complex includes two contributing prefabricated steel frame buildings built in 1920. The west building contains the original two-story office building that has been connected by one-story infill to the long one-story warehouse building that contained the pressing and mounting departments and a three-part warehouse. The east building today consists of the foundry with attached original washrooms and office, charging room, and an expanded mill room.

It was listed on the National Register of Historic Places in 2008.

References

Industrial buildings and structures on the National Register of Historic Places in Virginia
Industrial buildings completed in 1920
Buildings and structures in Richmond, Virginia
National Register of Historic Places in Richmond, Virginia
Stoves